Maybrat is a Papuan language spoken in the central parts of the Bird's Head Peninsula in the Indonesian province of Southwest Papua.

Maybrat is also known as Ayamaru, after the name of its principal dialect, while the divergent Karon Dori dialect has sometimes been counted as a separate language.  Maybrat has not been demonstrated to be related to any other language, and so is often considered a language isolate. Nevertheless, in its grammatical structure, it has a number of features that are shared with the neighbouring languages.

Maybrat is characterised by a relatively small consonant inventory and an avoidance of most types of consonant clusters. There are two genders: masculine and unmarked. Morphology is simple. Verbs and inalienably possessed nouns alike take person prefixes. There is an elaborate system of demonstratives (words like "this" or "that"), with encoding for distance from the speaker, specificity, and syntactic function. In the clause, there is a fairly rigid subject–verb–object word order, and within noun phrases modifiers follow the head noun. Verb sequences, including serial verbs are very common, and verbs are used for a number of functions which in languages like English are served by adjectives or prepositions.

Background 
With around 25,000 speakers (as of 1987), Maybrat is among the most populous languages of Indonesian Papua. Its speakers are the Maybrat people, whose main occupations have been hunting, fishing, and swidden agriculture. They have traditionally lived in scattered homesteads, with the organisation into villages (kampongs) initiated by the efforts of the Dutch administration between the 1930s and the 1950s. This has had an effect on the language. For example, the establishment of the settlement of Ayawasi in 1953 brought together scattered local groups where each family had spoken a slightly different "family dialect", resulting in a "melting pot" where these small dialectal differences are levelled in the speech of the younger generations.

Maybrat is spoken in a large area in the central parts of the Bird's Head Peninsula and a large portion of its speakers are concentrated around the Ayamaru Lakes, although many are also found in urban areas of Indonesian Papua. Maybrat is surrounded by a number of languages. To the north are two other isolates: Abun and Mpur; to the east are Meyah and Moskona, both members of the East Bird's Head language family; the South Bird's Head languages Arandai, Kaburi, Kais, and Konda are spoken to the south; the neighbouring languages to the west are Tehit and Moraid, both of the West Bird's Head family.

The Malay language served as the language of wider communication in this area during the Dutch administration,  while more recently the related Indonesian language has taken up this role. Most Maybrat speakers in Ayawasi, for example, are fully bilingual in Indonesian, with the use of Indonesian loanwords and code-switching between the two languages fairly common.

The word "Maybrat" is a compound of mai 'sound, language', and according to one explanation, its meaning is "the language Brat", where "Brat" is the name of a hill near the village of Semetu in the Ayamaru region.

Classification and dialects 
Maybrat is often considered to be a language isolate, as a genetic relationship to any other language has not been established. There have been attempts to subsume it under putative families like the "Toror languages" (also including Abun and the West Bird's Head languages), or the broader West Papuan phylum. Even if not demonstrably related to any other language and sharing only a small percentage of its vocabulary with its neighbours, Maybrat nevertheless has a great deal in its grammatical structure that resembles other languages of the Bird's Head.

There have been various classifications and listings of the dialects of Maybrat. The local tradition of the speakers recognises the following six dialects (the villages where each is spoken are given in brackets):
Mayhapeh (Ayawasi, Kokas, Mosun, Konya, Kumurkek)
Mayasmaun (Ayata, Kamat, Aisa)
Karon (Senopi, Fef)
Maymare (Suswa, Sire)
Maymaru (Ayamaru): in Ayamaru District and Ayamaru Timur District
Mayte (Aytinyo, Fuoh): in Aytinyo District
The most distinct dialect, at least in comparison to Mayhapeh, is Karon, which in some previous surveys has been listed as a separate language. The differences between Maymaru and Mayhapeh on the other hand are very small, but the two are nevertheless regarded by their speakers as distinct dialects. This is largely because the Maymaru speak significantly faster, so much so that the Mayhapeh often have difficulties understanding them. The dialect whose phonology and grammar are described in the following sections is Mayhapeh, as analysed by Dol in her 2007 grammar. The two papers by Brown (1990, 1991) are on noun phrases and phonology and they are based on the Maymaru dialect as spoken in the village of Kambuaya.

Phonology 
Maybrat has five vowel phonemes and a small consonant inventory consisting of between nine and eleven consonant phonemes, depending on the analysis. Closed syllables are not uncommon, but most types of consonant clusters are broken up with the insertion of a schwa vowel. The placement of stress is not predictable.

Vowels 
The following table presents the five Maybrat vowels along with their allophones as documented in the Mayhapeh dialect:

A non-phonemic schwa vowel  is used, mostly to break up consonant clusters (see below). A schwa is also optionally inserted before the initial consonant in a small number of short words:  ~  'night'. Vowels are phonetically lengthened in stressed one-syllable words. A vowel at the start of a word is optionally preceded, and a vowel at the end of a word is optionally followed, by a non-phonemic glottal stop , typically when the word is uttered in isolation:  ~  'rain',  ~  'they drink'.

Not all of these allophones have been documented in the Maymaru dialect. However, it does have the following allophone rules not described for the Mayhapeh dialect: word-final /o/ is pronounced as [] after /i/, while unstressed word-final /a/ is realised as [].

Consonants 

In the Mayhapeh dialect, the bilabial stop  does not occur at the end of the word. It has two allophones – voiceless  and voiced  – which are in free variation in all positions: /tapam/ 'land' → ; the voiceless allophone is more common, even between vowels. The velar stop  is voiceless, but it has an optional voiced allophone  between vowels and an optional unreleased allophone  at the end of the word. The alveolar stop  is always voiceless, and in word-final position  is in free variation with the aspirated  and the unreleased : /poiit/ 'food' → . The velar fricative //, which in the practical orthography is written as h, can be either voiceless  or voiced : /xren/ 'they sit' → . The rhotic consonant is always an alveolar trill  at the start of the word, while in other positions it is in free variation with the alveolar tap .

Voiced allophones are generally more common in the other dialects. For example, in the Maymaru dialect, spoken in the area of Ayamaru, the bilabial stop is always voiced , while the alveolar stop  becomes voiced  after . The velar stop  becomes voiced  either before  or after .

Consonant clusters 
At the phonemic level, consonant clusters do occur, either at the start or in the middle of the word, but they are invariably broken up by the insertion of the epenthetic vowel schwa . Thus, /tre/ 'bracelet' is pronounced , /twok/ →  'they enter', /mti/ →  'evening'. This also happens when the consonant cluster is in the middle of the word between vowels (/mfokfok/ →  'they roll'), except if the first consonant of the cluster is a nasal: /nimpon/ →  'watermelon'. The epenthetic schwa can assimilate in quality to the following vowel: /mtie/ → .

Stress
The placement of stress is not predictable, although it most often falls on the first syllable (schwa vowels getting skipped: /tfo/ → ). Stress is phonemic at least in the Maymaru dialect. In his description of this dialect, Brown adduces several minimal pairs of words that differ solely in the placement of stress:  'they' (with the stress falling on the first syllable) vs.  'fence' (stress falling on the second syllable),  'she itches' vs.  'she takes'. In her study of the Mayhapeh dialect of Ayawasi, Dol notes that such pairs, though perceived by the native speakers as distinct, are acoustically indistinguishable, thus "they" and "fence" are both . Her conclusion, which has received some criticism, is that stress is only weakly phonemic.

At the end of a sentence, many older speakers blow a puff of air through their nose, which appears to be a common phenomenon in the languages of the Bird's Head Peninsula.

Grammar

Personal pronouns and prefixes 
Maybrat has a set of independent personal pronouns and the corresponding person prefixes that are used with verbs and some nouns:

The Maymaru dialect distinguishes between inclusive 'we' (meaning 'I + you') and exclusive 'we' ('I + he/she'). The inclusive form is anu (with corresponding person prefix b-) and the exclusive one is amu (with prefix n-). It also has somewhat different pronouns for the first and second person singular:  tyo 'I', and nyo 'you (singular)'.

The person prefixes are obligatory for verbs and for inalienably possessed nouns (see below for these possession constructions). When added to a verb, the prefix indexes the subject (-amo ' goes'), and when added to an inalienably possessed noun, it indexes the possessor (-ana ' head'). If the verb or noun begins with the vowel a- then this vowel is dropped before prefixes for the first and second person plural. The following table lists the prefixes of the Mayhapeh dialect along with an example paradigm:

There are words, nouns or verbs, that do not take person prefixes. This is largely determined phonologically: the prefix is not allowed if its addition would result in a word of three or more syllables. There are also five verbs that are exceptions: they do not allow person prefixes even though they are otherwise phonologically eligible.

Demonstratives 
Maybrat has an elaborate system of demonstratives (these are words like "this", "that", or "there"). They are morphologically complex and consist of a prefix, a demonstrative base, and a suffix. The four demonstrative bases are differentiated based on distance from the speaker: -f- is for objects that are within physical reach of the speaker, -t- indicates objects a little further away but still near, -n- refers to objects that are far away, while -au does not specify a distance and so is used when the distance from the speaker is irrelevant. The demonstrative base is followed by a suffix specifying gender: -o is unmarked for gender, and -i, -ait or -e are for the masculine. Which of the three masculine suffixes to choose depends on the base: -ait is only used after -t, -e is used with -n-, while -i usually combines with -f-. Gender is relevant only with certain prefixes (re- and me-/-fi- + -t-); otherwise, the unmarked suffix -o is used. Examples of the masculine and the unmarked forms:

The demonstratives in the examples above have the prefix re-, which is used when the specific location of the object is known. If the exact location of the object is not known, then another prefix we- is employed:

Another prefix is te-, which refers to area, and so demonstratives with this prefix correspond to English words like "here" or "there", unlike ones with re- and we-, which can usually be translated as this or that:

All three prefixes discussed above – re-, we- and te- – mark their demonstratives for attributive use, that is, such demonstratives typically occur within a noun phrase and modify the head noun. Another set of prefixes is used for adverbial demonstratives, ones that can be used as adverbs to modify a clause. The following two examples contrast attributive and adverbial demonstratives:

Another prefix is me-. It expresses a presentative: it introduces a new referent, which will normally be the topic of what follows next. Examples are:

Two further prefixes are fi- 'similar.to', and ti- 'side':

The specific demonstratives mentioned earlier, refo, reto, and rono, can also be used without the re- prefix – as fo, to and no – without a significant change of meaning. Two of these – fo and to – have an additional function. They can serve as anaphoric pronouns, referring to entities mentioned earlier in the text.

Many of the demonstrative prefixes can also combine with the interrogative base -yo/-ye, resulting in the question words fi-ye 'how?', ro-yo 'which one?' and three more that translates into English as 'where?': to-yo, wo-yo and mi-yo. The difference between the three parallels the difference between the corresponding demonstratives. Mi-yo is used adverbially, while wo-yo and to-yo are normally used to question the locational object of verbs, with the distinguishing feature between these two being the degree of specificity:

Other question words are awiya 'who?', r-awiya 'whose?', p-awiya 'what?', tiya 'how much/many?' and titiya 'when?'.

Numerals and counting 
The younger people, noted Philomena Dol in the 1990s, normally count in Indonesian. Maybrat's traditional counting system described in the rest of this section is nowadays mostly confined to the older generation. It employs base-5 numerals, in common with other non-Austronesian languages of the area.
Counting usually starts at the little finger of either hand, and proceeds along the fingers of this hand using the dedicated number words: sait (for masculine) and sau (non-masculine) for 'one', ewok (or eok) meaning 'two', tuf 'three', tiet 'four', and mat 'five'. The numbers from six to nine are counted on the other hand, again starting from the little finger, using the complex numerals krem sau (literally 'one finger') for 'six', krem ewok (lit. 'two fingers') for 'seven', etc. 'Ten' is the word statem, which is derived from t-atem 'my hand'. Counting then proceeds with the little toe on one of the feet, where 'eleven' is oo krem sau (lit. 'foot toe one'), 'twelve' is oo krem ewok (lit. 'foot toe two'), etc. until 'fifteen' oo sau muf (lit. 'one full foot'). After that, counting moves to the big toe of the other foot, with 'sixteen' being oo sau krem sau (lit. 'one foot, one toe'). Counting ends at the little toe, with the word for 'twenty' rae sait yhai literally meaning 'one man is gone'. Multiples of twenty then count the number of 'men gone', thus 'forty' is rae ewok mhai, lit. 'two men are gone'.

Nouns and noun phrases

Nouns 
Maybrat nouns referring to male humans have a masculine gender. This is not expressed on the noun but shows up in the choice of a personal prefix on words agreeing with this noun. The masculine prefix y- contrasts with m-, which is used for female humans, inanimate nouns, and in the plural (regardless of gender). This makes the feminine the unmarked form, which is in common with most of the Papuan languages that make a gender distinction in their grammar and it is in contrast to such languages in the rest of the world. Nouns do not take number marking.

Nouns can be derived from verbs using the prefix po- (which can be a standalone word meaning "thing"): -iit 'eat' -> poiit 'food', hren 'sit' -> pohren 'chair', -kah 'burn' -> pokah 'garden', kom 'write' -> pokom 'pen'. If forming an agent noun, the verb will then also take the person prefix m-  (provided its phonological form allows it): afit 'bite' -> pomafit 'mosquito' (lit. 'thing that bites'), haf 'pregnant' -> pomhaf 'pumpkin' (lit. 'thing that is pregnant').

Compound nouns can be formed of either noun + noun, or noun + verb. In both cases, the second element modifies the first one, for example fane rapuoh, a compound of fane 'pig' and rapuoh 'forest', means wild pig, which is a kind of pig. A compound noun is phonologically a single word, but each of the two elements retains its stress (unless this would result in two consecutive stressed syllables, in which case the stress of the first element is moved to the left), with the stress on the second element becoming the main stress of the compound.

Possession 
In common with most languages of the peninsula, Maybrat expresses possession differently depending on whether it is alienable or inalienable. Compare the two constructions:

Inalienably possessed nouns are the nouns for body parts (like "head", "root" etc.), kinship terms ("father", "wife" etc.), and spatial nouns (m-aom 'outside', m-asuf 'middle', etc.). Such nouns obligatorily take a pronominal prefix, which agrees in person with the possessor; if the possessor is explicitly stated, then it precedes the possessed noun. For alienable nouns, on the other hand, the possessor follows the possessed noun, which does not feature a pronominal prefix but instead takes the possessive marker ro. An inalienably possessed construction can itself be embedded in another possessed construction:

Noun phrases 
The order of constituents in a noun phrase generally follows the pattern:
head noun + adjectival verb + numeral or quantifying verb + demonstrative
The so-called 'adjectival verbs' (see below) are verbs that serve the function of what in English would have been an adjective. They take a person prefix that agrees with the head noun.

A numeral can be preceded by a classifier, whose use is optional and does not affect the meaning of the noun phrase. Classifiers agree in person with the head noun.

There are four classifiers: -ana 'head' (a general classifier that is most commonly used for humans and animates), -akan 'seed/stone' (for seeds and fruit), m-ake 'fruit' (for fruit), and -ata 'leaf' (for money/banknotes). A similar use is made of the noun yu 'bag' when giving the quantity of uncountables:

Quantifying verbs include verbs like waro 'little' and -siar 'many'. There are several verbs that correspond to the English "everyone/everything", these include: -kak 'absolutely everything/everyone', pria(n) 'everyone/everything', -tut 'everyone/everything' (for small groups), and wisau 'everyone/everything' (for large groups).

Last in the noun phrase comes the demonstrative:

Verbs 
Verbs in Maybrat obligatorily take person prefixes agreeing with the subject (see above for more details).

Verbs can be either intransitive (taking a single argument, a subject) or transitive (taking two arguments: a subject and an object). A subclass of intransitive verbs carry out functions for which languages like English use adjectives. Such 'adjectival' verbs can function both as predicates ("The book is red") and as attributes ("the red book"):

Clauses 
A clause consists of a predicate (typically a verb) and its arguments (typically expressed by noun phrases), with optional adverbial modifiers. In Maybrat, the order of the constituents in a clause is rigid; this is common in the languages of the Bird's Head, whether Papuan or Austronesian, but unusual for the Papuan languages broader afield.

Clauses show a single intonation contour, which involves a rise in pitch on the stressed syllable of the last vowel in the clause, and a subsequent sharp drop.

Because verbs take obligatory person prefixes, there is no need for a subject to be explicitly given if it is readily identifiable from the context. Thus, sentences consisting solely of a verb (with a person prefix) are acceptable:

If expressed,  the subject precedes the verb, while an object follows the verb. Thus, Maybrat has a rigid SVO word order.

The object can also be omitted if it can easily be inferred from the context:

An object can be given more prominence as a topic by moving it to the start of the clause. The object then has an intonation contour of its own and it is separated from the rest of the clause by a pause:

Adverbials for time are placed before the verb, and if there is a subject they can either precede or follow it:

All other types of adverbials (for manner, location, etc.) follow the verb:

In common with other languages of the region, Maybrat expresses negation by a clause-final particle. This particle is fe, whose typical use is given in the first example below. But fe can also function as a verb and take a person prefix, as in the second example. These two uses of fe can have different meanings, but the distinction between the two is not consistently maintained.

Questions have the same intonation pattern as other sentence types; this is in contrast to many other languages, like English, where questions typically have a high or rising pitch. Yes/No questions are formed by the addition of a at the end of the clause:

Content questions feature a question word replacing whatever part of the clause information is being sought for:

Verb sequences 
A notable feature of Maybrat is the extensive use that it makes of sequences of verbs without any overt marking of their relation. Such verb sequences are typified in a number of different constructions, which might be superficially similar, but show upon closer inspection to be syntactically distinct. For example, there might be differences in the readiness with which the verbs can take distinct intonation contours or allow to be separated by pauses, the availability of their objects for extraction into relative clauses, or the possibility for an interrogative particle to take scope over only one of the two verbs. The various types of verb sequences described in the rest of this section can be contrasted to coordinated constructions in which each verb forms a separate clause:

Complement clauses 
A group of constructions feature a complement clause: the second verb (and its clause) functions as the object of the first verb. The first verb can be a perception verb, a mental activity verb or a verb of saying:

Prepositional verbs 
A construction that bears certain resemblance to the serial verb constructions known in other languages involves the four so-called prepositional verbs. These are -ae 'at', -kit 'towards', -pat 'from', and -kah 'with/to/for':

There is a cline between typical verbs on the one hand and typical prepositions on the other. The four "prepositional verbs" of Maybrat each fall on different points along this cline and possess different combinations of verbal or prepositional characteristics. One typically verbal characteristic is the ability to serve as the main verb of a clause: -ae 'at' alone among these four can function as the main verb of a clause. Another verbal characteristic is the ability to show agreement with the subject of the clause. In this respect, the two verbs -kit 'towards' and -pat 'from' are more verbal in that they always take person prefixes agreeing with the subject; this contrasts both with -kah 'with/to/for', which always takes only the unmarked third-person prefix m- regardless of the subject, and with -ae, which may follow either pattern. These four verbs also differ in the extent to which their objects can be extracted into relative clauses.

Motion verbs 
Similar to serial verb constructions is also the construction with a second verb of motion (like -amo 'go') whose subject is the same as the object of the first verb:

A similar construction involving the verbs -o 'take' and -e 'give' is available to express the meaning of 'giving something to someone; such a construction is necessary because verbs in Maybrat can only take two arguments (a subject and an object) and so -e 'give' on its own cannot take arguments for both the object given and the person who received it:

Complex sentences 
Apart from the more or less tightly integrated verb sequences from the previous section, there also exist a number of ways of combining full clauses into complex sentences. For example, a number of conjunctions can be used for joining clauses  referring to events in a sequence: mati, na, mnan, or o:

Disjunction ('either, or') can be expressed with the negator fe. Subordinate clauses for purpose or cause are introduced with re 'in order to', mi 'so that', or ke 'because':

A relative clause is introduced by the relativiser ro: this is the same particle as the one used in possessive constructions (see above), and it may be related to the demonstrative re-.

Similar constructions are available for several kinds of subordinate adverbial clauses. Temporal adverbial clauses are introduced by um ro (lit. 'the moment when') or kine wo (lit. 'the time when') – the difference between these two relativisers parallels the difference between the related demonstrative prefixes re- (specific, can be pinpointed) and we- (non-specific).

Adverbial clauses for manner are introduced with fi-re, where fi- is the demonstrative prefix meaning "similar to". The marker for locative adverbial clauses can be one of wo, wo-yo or wo-re, without an apparent difference in meaning. An example of a locative clause:

A style figure common in narratives is tail-head linkage, where the last predicate of one sentence is repeated at the start of the next one:

Notes

References

Bibliography

Further reading 
 Contains a Maybrat story along with interlinear glosses and a translation.

External links
 An open access collection of Mai Brat language (CVL1) at Paradisec (requires registration)
 A wordlist at the Austronesian Basic Vocabulary Database (the more fragmentary list at TransNewGuinea.org includes items from the Karon Dori dialect)

1S:first person, singular
2:second person
3M:third person, masculine
3S:third person, singular
3U:third-person, unmarked gender
ADV:adverb(ial)
ATTR:attributive
ENUM:enumerator
INT:interrogative
NEG:negative particle
POSS:possessive marker
PROHIB:prohibitive
REDUP:reduplication
REL:relativiser
U:unmarked gender

Language isolates of New Guinea
West and Central Bird's Head languages
Languages of western New Guinea
Subject–verb–object languages
Isolating languages